The Young Ones (US title: Wonderful to Be Young!) is a 1961 British comedy musical film directed by Sidney J. Furie and starring Cliff Richard, Robert Morley as his character's father, Carole Gray as his love interest, and the Shadows as his band. The screenplay was written by Peter Myers and Ronald Cass, who also wrote most of the songs. Herbert Ross choreographed the dance scenes.

Although Richard had appeared in two pictures prior, The Young Ones was his first major film in a string of musical films including Summer Holiday and Wonderful Life. 
Its soundtrack spawning numerous hits including the title track.
 
The film was produced by the Associated British Picture Corporation and shot at their Elstree Studios. It had its World Premiere on 13 December 1961 at the Warner Theatre in London's West End.

Plot
The story is about a youth club member, and aspiring singer, Nicky (Cliff Richard) and his friends, who try to save their youth club in London's West End from an unscrupulous millionaire property developer Hamilton Black (Robert Morley), who plans to tear it down to make room for a large office block.

The members decide to put on a variety show to raise the money needed to buy a lease renewal. The twist in the story is that Nicky is Hamilton Black's son, something he keeps secret from his friends until some of them try to kidnap Black, to prevent him from stopping the show. Although he is fighting his father over the future of the youth club, Nicky cannot allow them to harm him, so he attacks the attackers and frees his father.

Meanwhile, Hamilton Black has realised that his son is the mystery singer that all of London is talking about, after the youth club members have done some pirate broadcasts to promote their show. So, although he has just bought the theatre where the show is to take place, in order to be able to stop it, the proud father decides that the show must go on. At the end, he joins the youth club members on stage, dancing and singing, after having promised to build them a new youth club.

Cast
 
 Cliff Richard as Nicky
 Robert Morley as Hamilton Black
 Carole Gray as Toni
 The Shadows as the musicians
 Teddy Green as Chris
 Richard O'Sullivan as Ernest
 Melvyn Hayes as Jimmy
 Annette Robertson as Barbara
 Robertson Hare as chauffeur
 Sonya Cordeau as Dorinda Morell
 Sean Sullivan as Eddie
 Harold Scott as Dench
 Gerald Harper as Watts
 Rita Webb as woman in market

Production
This was Cliff Richard's third film, following Serious Charge and Expresso Bongo. Producer Kenneth Harper hired Sidney J. Furie as director and Ronald Cass and Peter Myers as writers, and during a meeting in Harper's flat, the four agreed to borrow the storyline of the film musical Babes In Arms (1939), where youngsters Mickey Rooney and Judy Garland put on a show with their friends to raise money.

The film was originally intended to feature the Shadows in acting roles, but it was decided that more professional young actors needed to be cast instead, so the roles originally intended for Hank Marvin and Jet Harris were given to Richard O'Sullivan and Melvyn Hayes, while the Shadows themselves appear only as non-speaking band members.

A number of actresses were considered to be Cliff Richard's co-star. An early suggestion from the film's choreographer Herbert Ross was New York performer Barbra Streisand. Harper flew to New York and saw her in a show, but did not think that she was suitable. Another early consideration was German singer and actress Heidi Bruhl, while Richard himself in an interview expressed an interest in engaging the very young Helen Shapiro for the role.

In May 1961 it was announced that a 21-year-old actress from London's East End, Annette Robinson (aka Robertson), would be the female co-star, but within weeks the part was given to Carole Gray, a dancer known for her roles in West End theatre musicals, while Robinson was given the smaller role of Barbara. When Carole Gray sings in the film, it is
actually the voice of Grazina Frame, who also provided the singing voice for Lauri Peters in Cliff Richard's next film Summer Holiday (1963).

The standing set constructed for this film remained in situ for well over a decade, featuring in many television productions filmed at Elstree throughout the 60s and early 70s including The Avengers, The Saint, The Baron, UFO and The Protectors.

Vaudeville routine
Scenes set both outside and inside the fictional Countess Theatre (bought by Nicky's father Hamilton Black in the film) were filmed on location at the Finsbury Park Empire Theatre.  In the film, a medley of songs known as the "Vaudeville routine," framed by the song "What D'You Know, We've Got A Show", is performed by Nicky and his friends.  The entire sequence was recorded in one day (9 August 1961) at the Abbey Road studios, London. While session singers – the Mike Sammes Singers – were used on the album, the film version deployed the actors.

As Victor Rust describes it: "having broken into the dilapidated Finsbury Park Theatre, the members of the youth club, initially despondent, pick up the props, wardrobe, scenery and lighting, and enter into an extensive song and dance routine that features slapstick routines, jokes, songs and dancing".   It is this mixture of performance techniques that characterises vaudeville.

The eclectic references in the sequence includes "vaudeville, melodrama, the country house mystery and Astaire and Rogers".  At the end, Nicky, to a rapturous reception from screaming female fans, "high-kicking his way centre-stage", sings the chorus of "Living Doll".  Thus the quotations from "the performers of yesteryear" merge with "self-quotation" by Cliff.   This weaving of the present into the nostalgia creates a sense of continuity and forges a "common bond".   Napper reads the reprise of the Edwardian-inspired number at the end, complete with a reconciled Hamilton Black onstage, as "the point at which the generational conflict of the film is resolved, significantly through a continuity of entertainment values and styles".

Soundtrack
see The Young Ones (album)

Reception and legacy
The film was the second most popular movie at the British box office in 1961, following The Guns of Navarone, grossing over £750,000. (Films and Filming said it was the third most popular for Britain for the year ended 31 October 1962 after Navarone and Dr No.)

The title of the film was also used for the British television series The Young Ones (1982-1984), which contained many references to Cliff Richard throughout its twelve-episode run.

Stage adaptation
The film has been adapted into a stage musical by John Plews, which premiered at Upstairs at the Gatehouse in London in December 2007.  The stage adaptation follows the film story closely, but includes several additional songs. In February 2013 it premiered in Scotland at Eastwood Park Theatre in Giffnock, performed by the EROS Musical Society.

References

External links
 
 
 
 
 
 "On the Set of The Young Ones 1963, by British Pathé" This 10-minute reel shows Robert Morley and Cliff Richard being coached for the fight in the bar.  Also there are some shots of Richard filming various parts of the show that he and friends put on in the theatre.
 Notes and pictures of locations from Reel Streets website
 Article about the film by Bill Harry of the Liverpool music newspaper Mersey Beat

1961 films
1961 musical comedy films
1960s teen films
British musical comedy films
British teen comedy films
1960s English-language films
Films directed by Sidney J. Furie
Films set in London
CinemaScope films
Films shot at Associated British Studios
Films shot in London
Paramount Pictures films
Teen musical films
Associated British Picture Corporation
1960s British films